SST: Salo-Salo Together is a Philippine television variety show broadcast by GMA Network. It premiered on March 20, 1993 replacing Lunch Date. The show concluded on June 30, 1995 with a total of 684 episodes. It was replaced by Eat Bulaga! in its timeslot.

History

SST's first aired on March 20, 1993 as a replacement for Lunch Date, hosted by Randy Santiago, Dennis Padilla, and Smokey Manaloto with Liezl Martinez, Anjanette Abayari, Joy Ortega and Giselle Sanchez as co-hosts. In less than six months after it aired, SST started to overtake its arch-rival, Eat Bulaga! (ABS-CBN)  in the ratings by providing fresh interactive segments like "Grabe!" (a contest where live studio audience join the hosts of SST in a dare), "Knock Knock Hello!" (where SST wall clocks were given out to a lucky household member whose home was posted with an SST sticker), "Sari-Sari Stories" (a weekly comedy skit where SST hosts spoof a certain movie or Pinoy pop culture) and "Ano ka Hello?" (where SST hosts call out a lucky viewer and ask them questions about what they just saw in a particular episode). Moreover, SST hosts like Dennis, Smokey, Anjanette, Joy and Giselle became contract stars of Viva Films, where they have appeared separately in numerous movies. A free SST Sticker can be given to the audience on every weekdays.

Shortly before SST celebrated its first year on television, co-host Joy Ortega left the show.  She was subsequently replaced by Ai-Ai delas Alas who came from the predecessor show "Lunch Date". Main host Randy Santiago also started extra work for the show as the main director, with Cesar Cosme as 2nd unit director.  Soon after, SST gave a break to other newcomers in showbiz like Bayani Agbayani, Dale Villar and Bernadette Allyson (who was introduced as VJ Berna).

However amidst the high ratings of the show at that time, what started as a blind item eventually became showbiz news that "SST" was going to go off the air to give way to its rival noontime show "Eat Bulaga!" at the 12 pm slot. This transpired after "Bulaga!" itself had decided to move to GMA Network following their producer TAPE Inc.'s refusal to sell the show's rights to its previous home network, ABS-CBN. During "SST"'s New Year episode on December 31, 1994, the announcement of the new variety show's move to GMA was officially made by main hosts Randy Santiago and Dennis Padilla during the show's opening. The "SST" hosts and talents aired their sentiments on the announcement because they felt the GMA management did not give them a chance to prove that they could carry the noontime show to new heights.  At the same time, they were satisfied because the network decided to keep the show by moving "SST" to an earlier time slot to serve as a pre-programming to Eat Bulaga!. SST aired its final noontime episode on January 27, 1995. 
On January 30, 1995, SST was reformatted as a morning talk show, with its timeslot at 10:30 am. Entertainment writer Giovanni Calvo joined the "SST gang" as the segment host for "Katok Mga Misis", dishing out the latest rumors in show business.  However, "SST" was not able to dislodge ABS-CBN's "Teysi ng Tahanan" from the top spot and its ratings suffered.

On June 30, 1995, "SST" was cancelled after GMA executives decided to make the segment "Katok Mga Misis!" into a full-length program. The late Giovanni Calvo hosted the show along with his co-host Ali Sotto.

Hosts

 Randy Santiago 
 Dennis Padilla 
 Smokey Manaloto 
 Liezl Martinez 
 Anjanette Abayari 
 Joy Ortega 
 Giselle Sanchez 
 Dale Villar 
 Ai-Ai delas Alas 
 Bayani Agbayani 
 Bernadette Allyson 
 Giovanni Calvo

Segments
Ano Ka Hello?
GMA Rainbow Princess
Grabe!
Kape Muna
Katok Mga Misis!
Knock Knock Hello
M.R.S.: Musika Ni Randy Santiago
Me & My Mom
SST Dream Girl Beauty Pageant
SST Music Videos
Sari-Sari Stories
Secret

References

1993 Philippine television series debuts
1995 Philippine television series endings
Filipino-language television shows
GMA Network original programming
Philippine variety television shows